Tootbus London, formerly The Original Tour is a London bus tour operator using open-top double-decker buses. It also holds the franchise to run City Sightseeing's London tour. Based in Wandsworth, it is a subsidiary of RATP Dev.

History

The Original Tour was founded in by June 1951 by the London Transport Executive at the time of The Festival of Britain. In 1986 it was privatised, being sold to London Coaches / Blue Triangle. In December 1997 it was sold to Arriva. In March 2001 the London Pride Sightseeing business was purchased.

In September 2014, the business was sold to RATP Dev.

Sightseeing tours
After purchase of a 24-hour ticket or 48-hour ticket, ticket-holders may board any of the tour routes at over 80 different stops without another charge. Services operate daily, with a recorded commentary in English and several other languages which can be listened to with headphones. A river cruise and three walking tours are included in the ticket price.

The Original Tour operates four sightseeing routes, with two connectors from other places linking to them:

 

† Pre-recorded language commentaries provided on the T2 and T4 routes are English, French, Spanish, German, Italian, Russian, Japanese, as well as the "Kids' Club" children commentary in English.

T-prefixed Route Numbers
The "T.." route numbers introduced from April 2001 but used primarily for internal and licensing purposes. Used more widely during 2004 and fully adopted in 2005 with the entry into service of the Ayats bodied Volvo B7Ls, which were specified with electronic destination displays. Previously, the routes were only distinguishable by a coloured triangle, propped up on the dash on the bus, although some had a metal holder on the front. Since 2004 the triangle (which still exist for the older tour buses) have "T.." printed on them for the appropriate coloured triangle. Also, some buses now have destination display blinds, traditionally removed from these buses, which have the coloured triangle on them with the "T.." route number inside that.

Fares
The Original Tour tickets are valid for one or two days. Each ticket includes three free walking tours (Changing of the Guard, Rock ‘n’ Roll and Jack the Ripper) and a 24-hour River Cruise Pass.

Visitor centre
At the end of 2007 The Original Tour opened a visitor centre on 17-19 Cockspur Street, off Trafalgar Square.

Transport for London
In May 2004 The Original Tour became a Transport for London (TfL) contracted bus operator when it commenced operating route 337, the first time a route service had operated out of Wandsworth garage since 1986. Buses operated with Arriva London branding, but under The Original Tour's operating licence. When next tendered, route 337 passed to London General in May 2011 and The Original Tour ceased being a TfL operator.

Fleet
Historically the fleet consisted of former double deck route buses, that after being converted to open top configuration, were given a second life. However, in 2005 ten Ayats Bravo City bodied Volvo B7Ls were purchased new. As at September 2014, the fleet consisted of 90 buses.

Allocation
Some of the buses are in the standard City Sightseeing livery, rather than the Original Tour version, for use on route T2, which is branded as City Sightseeing. However, in practice, buses can be mixed up.

See also
Open top buses in the United Kingdom
Sightseeing

References

External links

Company website

RATP Group
Arriva Group bus operators in England
British companies established in 1951
Transport companies established in 1951
1951 establishments in England
City Sightseeing
London bus operators